256 (City of London) Field Hospital is a unit of the Royal Army Medical Corps within the Army Reserve of the British Army.

History
The hospital was formed in 1995, through the amalgamation of 217 (London) General Hospital, 257 (Southern) General Hospital, and 221 (Surrey) Field Ambulance, as 256 (London) Field Hospital. Later renamed ‘City of London’. As a consequence of Army 2020, the unit now falls under 2nd Medical Brigade, and is paired with 33 Field Hospital.

Under the Future Soldier programme, the hospital will be renamed as the 256 (London and South East) Multi-Role Medical Regiment by January 2024.  The regiment will come under 2nd Medical Group.

Current Structure
The hospital's current structure is as follows:
Headquarters, at Braganza Street drill hall, Walworth
A Detachment, at Braganza Street drill hall, Walworth
B Detachment, at Iverna Gardens drill hall, Kensington
C Detachment, at Kingston upon Thames
D Detachment, at Quebec Barracks, Brighton

References

Military units and formations established in 1995
Units of the Royal Army Medical Corps
Military units and formations in London
Military units and formations in Brighton and Hove
Military units and formations in Kensington
Military units and formations in Kingston upon Thames
Military units and formations in Southwark